Two Children is a 1924 German silent film directed by Richard Clement Hilber and starring Alexander Murski, Olga Belajeff and Suzanne Marwille.

The film's sets were designed by the art director Karl Machus.

Cast
 Alexander Murski as Knut Alsen
 Olga Belajeff as Margarete, Alsens Frau
 Suzanne Marwille as Emilie Thorhild
 Fritz Greiner as Niels, Chorist
 Luise Hohorst as Sophie, die Nachbarin
 Hans Schweikart as Peter Ovestad
 Clementine Plessner
 Rudolf Basil as Dr. Ralph Krüger, Haralds Erzieher
 Loni Nest as Christa Alsen
 Waldemar Potier as Harald

References

Bibliography
 Bock, Hans-Michael & Bergfelder, Tim. The Concise CineGraph. Encyclopedia of German Cinema. Berghahn Books, 2009.

External links

1924 films
Films of the Weimar Republic
German silent feature films
Films directed by Richard Clement Hilber
German black-and-white films
1920s German films